Sage College of Albany, SCA for short, was located at 140 New Scotland Avenue, Albany, New York, 12208. Along with Russell Sage College and the Sage Graduate School, it was one of the three colleges that made up The Sage Colleges. It was also home to Sage After Work, which offers a variety of bachelor's degrees in a format designed specifically for adult learners. It offered bachelor's degrees, with the largest programs being Visual Arts, Management and the interdisciplinary Law & Society. SCA students often took courses on the Russell Sage College campus in Troy, New York, or accelerated into one of the master's programs in the Sage Graduate School. 850 students were enrolled at SCA, and it shared approximately 150 faculty members with the other Sage colleges. About 66% of the student body were female. Since 2020, the former SCA is now Russell Sage's Albany campus.

History 

In 1949 Russell Sage College for women in Troy, NY, opened a coeducational Albany Division. Intended to serve the large number of veterans returning from World War II, state government workers, and others seeking an education related to workplace needs, the Albany Division offered associate, bachelor's and master's degrees in an evening schedule to an audience of working adults.

The first classes were offered in buildings located in downtown Albany.  President Lewis Froman received approval in 1957 to establish a "private junior college" operating on a daytime schedule in the same buildings. In the summer of 1959, the College purchased a portion site of the Albany Home for Children (later Parson's Child and Family Center, now Northern Rivers Family Center) at New Scotland and Academy Road and a year later the entire Albany Division moved to the new campus, continuing to coexist in the same buildings in daytime and evening schedules. In 1962, the Junior College of Albany received its own degree-granting power, and henceforth all associate degrees (day and evening) were awarded through JCA.

During the 1970s, art and design became signature programs for JCA and earned NASAD accreditation. For many years, the evening division continued to offer bachelor's and master's degrees under the charter of Russell Sage College. During the 1980s, the umbrella institution began to be known as The Sage Colleges, the two-year college as Sage Junior College of Albany, and the evening division as the Sage Evening College and Sage Graduate School. In 1995, these names were formalized and the Sage Graduate School received separate degree-granting powers.

In 2001, responding to the wishes of SJCA students to remain at Sage for four years, the rising credentials needed for entry-level professional positions, and the emerging workplace needs of the 21st century, Sage Junior College of Albany and Sage Evening College were replaced by a single four-year entity, Sage College of Albany.

Due to declining enrollment and a high amount of debt, The Sage Colleges board of directors voted unanimously in March 2019 to merge the three colleges under the name Russell Sage College. SCA became Russell Sage's Albany campus beginning in the fall of 2020.

Popular majors 

For bachelor's degrees

 Visual and Performing Arts: 23%
 Business: 17%
 Law & Society (Law, Psychology, Sociology, Criminology): 7%
 Nursing: 6%
 Education: 6%
 Accounting: 5%

Athletics, clubs and organizations 
Sage College of Albany fielded intercollegiate teams at the Division III level in basketball, soccer, tennis and golf. The college offered a number of organizations for their students to participate in.  They include: 
 Student Government Association
 The Navigators
 Association of Campus Events (A.C.E.)
 Gay Straight Alliance
 Residence Hall Council
 Film Club
 American Institute of Graphic Arts (A.I.G.A.)
 American Society of Interior Designers (ASID)
 Kitchen & Bath Design Club
 Psychology & Law Club
 Dance Club
 Video Game Club
 Science Club
 Running Club
 AIGA
 The Emeralds
 Vernacular
 Anime Club

Residence life 

Sage College of Albany's on-campus, coed residence hall provided living space for approximately 100 first-year students in good academic standing (over 2.00 GPA.) About 80% of Sage College of SCA first-year students lived in college housing.

After the first year, students might have decided to move into University Heights College Suites, a student-housing complex that has offered Sage students apartment-style living with fully furnished 2- and 4-bedroom units.

Sage College of Albany was a dry campus. Sodexho, Sage's main food distributor, had a liquor license but only distributed alcohol in specific places on campus such as the Opalka Gallery.

References 

Defunct private universities and colleges in New York (state)
Education in Albany, New York
Educational institutions established in 2002
The Sage Colleges
Universities and colleges in Albany County, New York
2002 establishments in New York (state)
Organizations based in Albany, New York
Educational institutions disestablished in 2020
2020 disestablishments in New York (state)